Kwesi Browne  (born 31 January 1994) is a Trinidad and Tobago male track cyclist, representing Trinidad and Tobago at international competitions. He won the bronze medal in the keirin at the 2014 Central American and Caribbean Games and also at the 2016 Pan American Track Cycling Championships.

He is currently training at the World Cycling Centre in Aigle, Switzerland in the lead up to the 2020 Olympic Games in Tokyo, Japan for which he has qualified to represent Trinidad and Tobago in his pet event, the Keirin.

References

External links

1994 births
Living people
Trinidad and Tobago male cyclists
Trinidad and Tobago track cyclists
Place of birth missing (living people)
Central American and Caribbean Games bronze medalists for Trinidad and Tobago
Competitors at the 2014 Central American and Caribbean Games
Central American and Caribbean Games medalists in cycling
Cyclists at the 2019 Pan American Games
Pan American Games competitors for Trinidad and Tobago
Cyclists at the 2018 Commonwealth Games
Commonwealth Games competitors for Trinidad and Tobago
Cyclists at the 2020 Summer Olympics
Olympic cyclists of Trinidad and Tobago
Competitors at the 2018 Central American and Caribbean Games
21st-century Trinidad and Tobago people